E. Tredcroft's Ground was a cricket ground at the Warnham Court estate, located at Horsham, Sussex. The first recorded match on the ground was in 1851, when the Gentlemen of Sussex played the Gentlemen of Surrey. Edward Tredcroft, after whom the ground is named, was part of the Gentlemen of Sussex team. The first first-class match held at the ground came in 1853 when Sussex played the Marylebone Cricket Club. Sussex played two further first-class matches at the ground; in 1854 and 1855, with both matches coming against the Marylebone Cricket Club. The 1855 fixture was the final recorded match on the ground. A woodland was later planted inside the boundary of the ground.

References

External links
E. Tredcroft's Ground on CricketArchive
E. Tredcroft's Ground on Cricinfo

Defunct cricket grounds in England
Cricket grounds in West Sussex
Horsham
Defunct sports venues in West Sussex
Sports venues completed in 1851
1851 establishments in England